Chauncy Jerome Jr Shipwreck Site is located in Long Branch City, Monmouth County, New Jersey, United States. The station was built in 1851 and added to the National Register of Historic Places on March 1, 1996.

See also
National Register of Historic Places listings in Monmouth County, New Jersey

References

Long Branch, New Jersey
National Register of Historic Places in Monmouth County, New Jersey
Shipwrecks on the National Register of Historic Places in New Jersey
New Jersey Register of Historic Places